Rekownica could refer to:

 Rekownica, a stream in Poland, a right-hand tributary of Omulew
 Rekownica, a village in Pomeranian Voivodeship of Poland
 Rekownica, a village in Warmian-Masurian Voivodeship of Poland